Elasmaria is a clade of ornithopods known from Cretaceous deposits in South America, Antarctica, and Australia that contains many bipedal ornithopods that were previously considered "hypsilophodonts".

Classification
Calvo et al. (2007) coined Elasmaria to accommodate Macrogryphosaurus and Talenkauen, which they recovered as basal iguanodonts distinct from other iguanodontians in having mineralized plates on the ribs. In 2016, a paper describing the genus Morrosaurus found Elasmaria to be far larger than its initial contents of two taxa, instead containing a variety of ornithopods from the Southern Hemisphere. In 2019, Matthew C. Herne and colleagues redefined Elasmaria as "all taxa closer to Macrogryphosaurus gondwanicus and Talenkauen santacrucensis than to Hypsilophodon foxii or Iguanodon bernissartensis", expanding the definition to include the large number of taxa now found to be part of the clade.

The cladogram below results from analysis by Herne et al., 2019.

References

Early Cretaceous first appearances
Maastrichtian extinctions
Ornithopods